Agnes Franz, real name Louise Antoinette Eleonore Konstanze Agnes Franzky, (8 February 1794 – 13 May 1843) was a German writer.

Life 
Born in Milicz, Silesia, Franz was the daughter of a Silesian government and court councillor. After the death of her father in 1801, her mother moved with her daughters to Ścinawa.

In 1807, she suffered a serious accident with her travelling carriage and remained physically disabled and suffering for the rest of her life. The family moved to Steinach in 1811 and later to Oberarnsdorf on an uncle's estate. At the outbreak of the German Campaign of 1813, the family fled to Landeck. A short stay in Dresden in 1821 brought her the acquaintance of Johann Friedrich Kind, Pauline von Brochowska and Theodor Hell. Her friendship with Julie von Großmann (1790-1860), who later administered and edited her estate.

When her mother died in 1822, Franz moved in with her sister, who was married in Wesel on the Lower Rhine, as she needed support due to her disability. She lived with her sister's family in Brandenburg between 1830 and 1837.

After the death of her brother-in-law in 1837, Franz moved to Breslau together with her sister and her sister's four children. Here, too, Franz became involved and founded a charity school, which she also directed.

The grave itself was levelled during road construction work on the occasion of the widening of Elbingstraße in July 1914.

Work 
 Der Sonnenhold. 1821
 Gedichte. 1826.
 Der Christbaum. 1829
 Parabeln. 1829
 Angela. 1831
 Stundenblumen. 1833
 Kinderschatz. 1841
 Vermächtnis an die Jugend. 1841
 Glycerion. 1842

References

Further reading 
 Adolph Kohut: Agnes Franz. Eine biographisch-literarische Studie. In: Nord und Süd. Eine deutsche Monatsschrift. 69th volumes. 1894, . Digitalisat
 
 
 A. Siebelt: Agnes Franz, eine vaterländische Dichterin. In Wir Schlesier. 5.1924/25, .
 Julie von Grossmann, Eine biographische Skizze, in Hell: Penelope für 1845, .

External links 
 
 
 Luise Antoinette Franzky in '' with detailed primary and secondary bibliography

German women writers
19th-century German women writers
1794 births
1843 deaths
People from Milicz